Tariq Tawfiq Selim (15 July 1937 – 16 July 2016) was an Egyptian footballer. He competed in the men's tournament at the 1960 Summer Olympics.

References

External links
 
 

1937 births
2016 deaths
Egyptian footballers
Egypt international footballers
Olympic footballers of Egypt
Footballers at the 1960 Summer Olympics
Sportspeople from Alexandria
Association football forwards